Lophiobrycon weitzmani is a species of small characin endemic to Brazil, where it is found in the upper Paraná River basin. It is considered threatened by Brazil's Ministry of the Environment. This species is the only member of its genus, but it is closely related to Glandulocauda and Mimagoniates (together they form the tribe Glandulocaudini).

Named in honor of Stanley H. Weitzman (1927-2017), Smithsonian Institution, for his “seminal” work on the systematics of neotropical characiformes, particularly the subfamily Glandulocaudinae (now subsumed into Stevardiinae).

References

Characidae
Monotypic fish genera
Fish of South America
Fish of Brazil
Endemic fauna of Brazil
Fish described in 2003